Brickland MRT station is a future Mass Rapid Transit station on the North South line located in Singapore. It will serve the Choa Chu Kang Neighbourhood 8 as well as Pavilion Park and Tengah Brickland District.

History
Brickland station was first announced on 25 May 2019 as part of the Land Transport Authority's (LTA) Land Transport Master Plan 2040.

References

Proposed railway stations in Singapore
Mass Rapid Transit (Singapore) stations